Selladore Vijayakumar (born 29 July 1979) is a cricketer. He plays for Singapore national cricket team. He is a right arm off break bowler.

Selladore Vijayakumar had played for Singapore team in the 2014 ICC World Cricket League Division Three. In this tournament Vijayakumar took 4/43 runs against United States national cricket team and  4/38 runs against Bermuda national cricket team. He also made his best bowling figures against Oman national cricket team with 4/20 runs at Al Dhaid on 27 January 2015. In August 2018, he was named in Singapore's squad for the 2018 Asia Cup Qualifier tournament.

In July 2019, he was named in Singapore's Twenty20 International (T20I) squad for the Regional Finals of the 2018–19 ICC T20 World Cup Asia Qualifier tournament. He made his T20I debut for Singapore against Qatar on 22 July 2019. In October 2019, he was named in Singapore's squad for the 2019 ICC T20 World Cup Qualifier tournament in the United Arab Emirates. However, on 24 October 2019, the International Cricket Council (ICC) announced that his bowling action was found to be illegal. He was suspended from bowling in international cricket matches until an assessment shows that his bowling action is legal.

References

1979 births
Living people
Singaporean cricketers
Singapore Twenty20 International cricketers
Singaporean people of Tamil descent
Singaporean sportspeople of Indian descent